Neolampedusa is a genus of longhorn beetles of the subfamily Lamiinae, containing the following species:

 Neolampedusa lateralis (Thomson, 1868)
 Neolampedusa obliquator (Fabricius, 1801)

References

Onciderini